The 1944 Massachusetts general election was held on November 7, 1944, throughout Massachusetts. Primary elections took place on July 11.

At the federal level, Republican Governor Leverett Saltonstall was elected to the United States Senate over Cambridge mayor John H. Corcoran in a special election to fill the vacancy caused by Henry Cabot Lodge Jr.'s resignation and Republicans won ten of fourteen seats in the United States House of Representatives.

In the race for Governor, Republican Lt. Governor Robert F. Bradford defeated incumbent Democrat Maurice Tobin. Overall, Republicans and Democrats evenly split the state-wide offices, with each party won three of the six elected offices. Republicans won both houses of the Massachusetts General Court

Governor

Republican Incumbent Leverett Saltonstall ran for a seat in the United States Senate rather than seeking reelection. Democratic Mayor of Boston Maurice J. Tobin defeated Republican Lieutenant Governor Horace T. Cahill.

Lieutenant Governor
In the race for lieutenant governor, Middlesex County District Attorney Robert F. Bradford (R) defeated Democratic former attorney general Paul A. Dever.

Republican primary
Middlesex County District Attorney Robert F. Bradford defeated Senate President Jarvis Hunt, Speaker of the House Rudolph King, Beverly mayor Daniel E. McLean, and perennial candidate William McMasters for the Republican nomination.

Democratic primary
Somerville assessor John B. Carr defeated former Worcester mayor John S. Sullivan, former state representative Alexander F. Sullivan, and Everett city councilor Alfred P. Farese for the Democratic nomination. Although he was a relative unknown in statewide politics, Carr did have a similar name to his party's 1942 lieutenant gubernatorial nominee, John C. Carr.

General election

Secretary of the Commonwealth
Twelve-term Republican Incumbent Frederic W. Cook ran unopposed in the primary and defeated Democrat Margaret O'Riordan in the general election for Secretary of the Commonwealth. John M. Bresnahan had defeated Margaret O'Riordan in the Democratic primary, but gave up the nomination to instead run for the United States House of Representatives seat in Massachusetts's 6th congressional district.

Democratic primary
Lynn school committee member John M. Bresnahan defeated Democratic National Committeewoman Margaret O'Riordan in the Democratic primary. Bresnahan also won the Democratic primary for the United States House of Representatives seat in Massachusetts's 6th congressional district. As he could not be the nominee in both races, Bresnahan relinquished his nomination for Secretary of the Commonwealth. O'Riordan was chosen by acclamation by the State Democratic Committee to replace Bresnahan on the ballot.

General election

Treasurer and Receiver-General
Incumbent Democratic Treasurer and Receiver-General Francis X. Hurley ran for Governor rather than seeking reelection. Democrat John E. Hurley defeated Republican Fred J. Burrell to succeed Hurley.

Republican primary
Former state treasurer Fred J. Burrell defeated former state senator Laurence Curtis for the Republican nomination.

Democratic primary
John E. Hurley, a former State Representative and secretary to Attorney General Paul A. Dever defeated attorney and Medfield assessor Francis C. McKenna, Democratic state committeeman Michael A. O'Leary, and state Auditor Thomas J. Buckley’s former confidential secretary John F. Welch to win the Democratic primary. Hurley was the fourth consecutive person in the past 14 years named Hurley to win the Democratic nomination for state treasurer, following Charles F. Hurley, William E. Hurley, and Francis X. Hurley.

General Election

Auditor
Incumbent Democratic Auditor Thomas J. Buckley ran unopposed in the Democratic primary and defeated Republican Frank A. Goodwin in the general election.

Republican primary
Registrar of Motor Vehicles Frank A. Goodwin defeated former Auditor Russell A. Wood and Young Republican Wallace E. Stearns in the Republican primary.

General Election

Attorney General
Incumbent Republican Attorney General Robert T. Bushnell did not run for reelection and was not a candidate for any other office. Republican Clarence A. Barnes defeated Democratic former Lt. Governor Francis E. Kelly to succeed Bushnell.

Republican primary
Massachusetts Governor’s Councilor Clarence A. Barnes defeated attorneys Charles Fairhurst and James E. Farley in the Republican primary.

Democratic primary
Former Lieutenant Governor Francis E. Kelly defeated former director of the state department of public works’ securities division John H. Backus, attorney Francis D. Harrigan, and World War II veteran Joseph M. McDonough in the Democratic primary.

General Election

United States Senate 

Governor Leverett Saltonstall (R) defeated Cambridge mayor John H. Corcoran (D) in a special election for the United States Senate seat previously held by Henry Cabot Lodge Jr., who had resigned from Massachusetts's other Senate seat in order to serve in World War II.

United States House of Representatives

All of Massachusetts' fourteen seats in the United States House of Representatives were up for election in 1944.

Ten seats were won by Republican Party candidates. 

Eleven seats were won by candidates seeking re-election. The 1st District seat (based in Western Massachusetts) was won by Republican John W. Heselton. Heselton defeated Democrat James P. McAndrews in a close race to succeed the retired Allen T. Treadway

See also
 154th Massachusetts General Court (1945–1946)

References

External links

 
Massachusetts